Leduc-Beaumont-Devon was a provincial electoral district in Alberta, Canada mandated to return a single member to the Legislative Assembly of Alberta using the first-past-the-post method of voting from 2004 to 2012.

The district and its antecedents have traditionally been a stronghold of votes for the Progressive Conservatives over the last few decades.

The district was created in the 2004 boundary re-distribution from the old Leduc electoral district. It was named after the City of Leduc and Leduc County as well as the towns of Beaumont and Devon. The district is mixed urban and rural as it also contains large rural portions.

Leduc-Beaumont-Devon history

Boundary history

Electoral history
Leduc-Beaumont-Devon electoral district was created from the old district of Leduc in the 2003 electoral boundary re-distribution. The riding remained similar with only minor changes but added Beaumont and Devon to the name.

The first election saw Progressive Conservative candidate George Rogers win over 50% of the vote over a slate of five other candidates. He ran for re-election to a second term in 2008 and won the district with a landslide.

The Leduc-Beaumont-Devon electoral district was dissolved in the 2010 electoral boundary re-distribution, the western portion was reformed as the Leduc-Beaumont electoral district, while the eastern portion was included in Battle River-Wainwright electoral district.

Election results

2004 general election

2008 general election

Alberta Senate election

2004 Senate nominee election district results
Voters had the option of selecting 4 Candidates on the Ballot

2004 Student Vote

On November 19, 2004 a Student Vote was conducted at participating Alberta schools to parallel the 2004 Alberta general election results. The vote was designed to educate students and simulate the electoral process for persons who have not yet reached the legal majority. The vote was conducted in 80 of the 83 provincial electoral districts with students voting for actual election candidates. Schools with a large student body that reside in another electoral district had the option to vote for candidates outside of the electoral district then where they were physically located.

See also
List of Alberta provincial electoral districts

References

External links
Elections Alberta
The Legislative Assembly of Alberta

Former provincial electoral districts of Alberta
Leduc, Alberta